Taouima is a town in Nador Province, Oriental, Morocco. According to the 2004 census it has a population of 6,909.

References

Populated places in Oriental (Morocco)